Jasmine Tookes (born February 1, 1991) is an American model and former Victoria's Secret Angel.

Early life
Tookes was born and raised in Huntington Beach, California. She has a younger sister, who is 19 years her junior. She did gymnastics for ten years and was also active in volleyball and softball before she became a model at about the age of 15. Her mother is a celebrity fashion stylist. Tookes was discovered at one of her mother's showroom appointments.

She has described her ancestry as a mix of "African American, Brazilian, European, and West Indian".

Career

Tookes' first commercial ad campaigns were in 2010 for UGG Australia and Gap. Before breaking out on the international scene, she booked a Spring 2011 DKNY campaign and a layout in Vogue Italia. Models.com named Tookes as one of the top 10 new models in a September 27, 2011, fashion week post. Tookes was selected by Style as its top new model in November 2011 based on her work for the Spring Fashion Shows. She was one of eleven new models for the annual Victoria's Secret Fashion Show in 2012. The 2012 show was taped in November and broadcast on the CBS network on December 4. The night before the airing of the fashion show, Tookes and fellow Victoria's Secret models Behati Prinsloo and Jacquelyn Jablonski guest starred on the December 3 "Ha'awe Make Loa" episode of CBS' Hawaii Five-0. French Vogue named her as one of its 10 New faces from fall/winter 2012–2013 Fashion Week.

Tookes has appeared in editorials for Italian, American, French, German, and Spanish Vogue, Harper's Bazaar, Numéro, W, and V. her cover include Elle France February 2013, Vogue Espana March 2016 alongside her fellow Victoria's Secret Angels, Harper's Bazaar Vietnam July 2016 along with Elsa Hosk and Martha Hunt, Maxim Magazine February 2017, and also Elle USA May 2017.

She has walked the runways for Burberry, Salvatore Ferragamo, Carolina Herrera, Moschino, Ralph Lauren, DKNY, Shiatzy Chen, Herve Leger, Ermanno Scervino, Giorgio Armani, Philipp Plein, Missoni, Jason Wu, Alberta Ferretti, Emilio Pucci, Balmain, Marc Jacobs, Oscar de la Renta, Giambattista Valli, Vera Wang, Calvin Klein, Tom Ford, Yves Saint Laurent, Trussardi, Marchesa, Tory Burch, Dolce & Gabbana, Stella McCartney, Paco Rabanne, Helmut Lang, Louis Vuitton, DSquared2, Tommy Hilfiger, Calvin Klein, Tom Ford, Prada, Jill Stuart, rag+bone, Miu Miu and Versace.

She and fellow VS Angel Josephine Skriver co-founded JOJA, an active-wear company. 

She has appeared in advertising campaigns for Bobbi Brown Cosmetics, Jimmy Choo, Calvin Klein, Lancôme, DKNY, Ralph Lauren, Kate Spade, Gap, Ugg, and Victoria's Secret. In 2015, she became a Victoria's Secret Angel. Tookes was selected to wear the Victoria's Secret Fashion Show Fantasy Bra (worth $3 million in 2016) at the 2016 show, which was held in Paris, France, which made her the 3rd black model to wear the bra. Tookes made her debut at No. 17 on Forbes "The World's Highest Paid Models" list in 2016, with estimated earnings of $4 million.

She was ranked Most Beautiful Face in the World by TC Candler in 2022

Personal life
In September 2020, Tookes announced her engagement to her boyfriend of four years, Juan David Borrero. He is the director of international markets of Snap Inc. and the son of doctor Alfredo Borrero Vega, the Vice President of Ecuador. They married on September 4, 2021, at the Iglesia y Convento de San Francisco in Quito, Ecuador. On November 21, 2022, she announced on her Instagram account that they are expecting their first child. Tookes gave birth to their daughter, Mia Victoria, on February 23, 2023.

References

External links

 
 
 

1991 births
Female models from California
African-American female models
American female models
African-American models
Living people
People from Huntington Beach, California
American people of British descent
American people of West Indian descent
Victoria's Secret Angels
American people of Brazilian descent
The Lions (agency) models
Elite Model Management models
21st-century African-American people
21st-century African-American women